Events in the year 1888 in India.

Incumbents
 Empress of India – Queen Victoria
 Viceroy of India – The Earl of Dufferin
 Viceroy of India – Henry Petty-Fitzmaurice, 5th Marquess of Lansdowne (from 10 December)

Events
 National income - 4,773 million
Mohandas Karamchand Gandhi left to study in London.
Sree Narayana Guru, consecrated the first temple for the untouchables in Aruvippuram, Kerala, South India.

Law
Indian Reserve Forces Act

Births
17 January – Babu Gulabrai, writer and historian (d.1963).
21 April - Charu Chandra Biswas,.
5 September – Sarvepalli Radhakrishnan, philosopher and statesman, first Vice President of India and second President of India (d.1975).
7 November – C. V. Raman, physicist, awarded the 1930 Nobel Prize in Physics (d.1970).
11 November – J. B. Kripalani, Freedom Fighter, Congress President (d. 1982).
11 November – Abul Kalam Azad, Freedom Fighter (d.1958).
16 December – Harold Papworth, British educator, college principal and Indian civil service officer (d. 1953)
 unknown date – Ahmad Saeed Dehlavi, freedom fighter and first general secretary of the Jamiat Ulama-e-Hind. (d. 1959).

References

 
India
Years of the 19th century in India
1880s in India
1888 in Asia